Dick Egan was an American football player who as an end for five seasons with the Chicago Cardinals (f1920-24) and Kenosha Maroons in the National Football League (NFL).

References

External links
 
 Pro Football Archives

Year of birth missing
Year of death missing
Players of American football from Chicago
American football ends
DePaul Blue Demons football players
Chicago Cardinals players
Kenosha Maroons players